Grand Strand Medical Center is a for-profit, 403-bed hospital in Myrtle Beach, South Carolina owned and operated by HCA Healthcare.

History 
Grand Strand Medical Center originally opened in 1978. Since then, the hospital has undergone multiple additions, including a $15 million, 15,000-square-foot addition in 2014 to enhance the pediatrics, medical surgery, and intensive care departments.  In 2021, the hospital added an additional 32 patient beds as part of a $14.5 million, 24,000 square foot expansion. Galen College of Nursing opened a campus at Grand Strand Medical Center in 2022.

Facilities 
The hospital is an American College of Surgeons-verified Level I trauma center, Level II pediatric trauma center, and a DNV-GL certified Comprehensive Stroke Center. The hospital also offers cardiac surgery, neurosurgery, and a pediatric intensive care unit (PICU).

References

External links 
 Grand Strand Health

Hospitals in South Carolina
Hospitals established in 1978
Myrtle Beach, South Carolina
Trauma centers
HCA Healthcare